Choi Youn-Ok (born ) is a retired South Korean female volleyball player. She was part of the South Korea women's national volleyball team.

She participated in the 2011 FIVB Volleyball Women's World Cup, and the 2015 FIVB Volleyball World Grand Prix.

References

External links
 Profile at FIVB.org

1985 births
Living people
South Korean women's volleyball players
Place of birth missing (living people)